Wanglu is a town of Yutai County, Shandong, China. , it has 17 villages under its administration.

References

Township-level divisions of Shandong
Yutai County